Ousman Nyan (born August 5, 1975) is a retired Norwegian footballer.

His brother Alpha Nyan is also a football player and coach.

References

1975 births
Living people
Norwegian footballers
Mjøndalen IF players
Strømsgodset Toppfotball players
IK Start players
AC Ajaccio players
Sogndal Fotball players
Ligue 1 players
Gambian emigrants to Norway
Norwegian expatriate footballers
Expatriate footballers in France
Norwegian expatriate sportspeople in France

Association football midfielders